Narciso Vernizzi (October 21, 1918 in Brazil – July 11, 2005 in São Roque, São Paulo, Brazil) was a Brazilian sports journalist and a radio broadcaster.

He worked for 56 years on Rádio Jovem Pan in São Paulo, he became a sports journalist in 1947.  He created his first sport show permanently on Brazilian radio in the 1960s.

He was known in all of the state of São Paulo with O Homem do Tempo (The Weather Man) in a part of 1963, he was the first radio broadcaster who emitted weather bulletins on radio and on television.  He later worked on TV Redord in São Paulo, a part of 1965.  He was a weatherman.

He died at the age of 86 of natural causes, he left himself with two sons, Sérgio and Celso (both are meteorologists) in various networks.

References

1918 births
2005 deaths
Brazilian journalists
Weather presenters
Brazilian people of Italian descent
Brazilian radio personalities
20th-century journalists
People from São Roque, São Paulo